Coomalbidgup is a town in the Goldfields-Esperance region of Western Australia.

References

Shire of Esperance